Zintha is a butterfly genus in the family Lycaenidae. It is monotypic, with the only species being Zintha hintza, the blue-eyed Pierrot, blue pied Pierrot or Hintza blue. The pied Pierrots proper are the closely related genus Tuxentius, however, and like Zintha they were formerly included in Castalius.

Description
The wingspan is 24–28 mm for males and 24–27 mm for females. Adults are on wing from September to April.

Food plants
The larvae feed on Ziziphus species, including Z. zeyheriana and Z. mucronata.

Distribution and subspecies
This butterfly occurs in tropical eastern and southern Africa. Three subspecies are recognized:
 Zintha hintza hintza (Trimen, 1864) – South Africa to Kenya, possibly Zaire
 Zintha hintza krooni (Dickson, 1973) – Namibia and adjacent regions
 Zintha hintza resplendens (Butler, 1876) – Ethiopia and adjacent regions

Gallery

Footnotes

References
  (2008): Tree of Life Web Project – Zintha hintza (Trimen 1864). The Blue-eyed Pierrot. Version of 2008-MAY-19. Retrieved 2009-NOV-29.
  (2009): Lepidoptera and Some Other Life Forms – Zintha. Version of 2007-MAY-20. Retrieved 2009-NOV-29.
Seitz, A. Die Gross-Schmetterlinge der Erde 13: Die Afrikanischen Tagfalter. Plate XIII 73 b

External links

Polyommatini
Monotypic butterfly genera
Lycaenidae genera